St. Joseph's Academy is a private, all-girls, Roman Catholic, college preparatory high school in Frontenac, Missouri, a suburb of St. Louis. It is operated by the Roman Catholic Archdiocese of Saint Louis. The school is sponsored by the Sisters of St. Joseph of Carondelet.

History
St. Joseph's Academy was founded as Mother Celestine's in 1840. Mother St. John Fontbonne and the Superior Sisters of St. Joseph were sent from Lyon, France to the territories of Cahokia and Carondelet. Upon their arrival, they opened a convent school.

In 1841, Mother Celestine's moved from the log cabin that it had been founded in to a motherhouse in Carondelet, Missouri. In 1925, the Academy moved into Clayton, Missouri along with Fontbonne University. In 1946, the campus became too small for both the high school and the college, so the Academy abandoned the city and moved to Frontenac, Missouri. In 1955, the new building opened.

Notable alumni
 Kristin Folkl, professional basketball player
 Tisha Terrasini Banker, actress

References

External links
School Website

Girls' schools in Missouri
Roman Catholic secondary schools in St. Louis County, Missouri
Educational institutions established in 1836
Roman Catholic Archdiocese of St. Louis
1836 establishments in Missouri
Buildings and structures in St. Louis County, Missouri